Nashik valley wines are specially protected under the patent of the Geographical Indication in India for the region of Nashik district in Maharashtra, India, where it is produced from several vineyards and the Sula wine is one of the major producer of Wines in Nashik. The wine is produced in two types: red and white.  The district has 52 wineries in operation and consequently Nashik is occasionally known by the epithet "The Wine Capital of India".

The product is protected under the Geographical Indications of Goods (Registration & Protection) Act (GI Act) 1999 of the Government of India. It was registered by the Controller General of Patents Designs and Trademarks under the title "Nashik Valley Wine" and listed at GI Application number 123 under Class 33 as an alcoholic beverage. Under the protection stipulations, at least 80% of the grapes used for making wine are to be grown in the Nashik district, and the wines are to be produced, bottled, and labelled within the district.

Geography

The soil condition consists of red laterite with good drainage conditions and generally with chemical properties suitable for growing wine grapes. The water quality is also stated to be ideal for growth of quality wine grapes.

The Nashik  district has 52 wineries in operation and consequently Nashik is occasionally known by the epithet "The Wine Capital of India.

History
According to the Nashik district Gazetteer grapes have existed as a horticultural crop in Nashik from 1950s. However, it was only in 1987 that Madhavrao More established a Co-operative Winery known as Pimpane Co-operative Ltd in collaboration with M/s Harbault & Fils Epernary France to produce wine from table grade grapes. Chardonnay and Pinot noir were planted and the Co-operative produced 500,000 bottles out of which 35,000 bottles were exported to France and to some other countries in Europe. But due to problems in harvesting this export was discontinued in 2003.

In 1996, Rajeev Samant, a Stanford graduate, who returned to Nashik to farm imported grape varieties Chenin blanc, Sauvignon blanc and Zinfandel and planted them in the land owned by his family. In 1997, Kerry Damskey, a leading wine maker from California's Sonoma Valley (the largest wine producer in the Wine Country region) provided the expertise for vinification of wine grapes. The first wine came to be marketed in March 2000 under the trade name "Sula". Several other farmers joined him in propagation of this effort. The wine magazine the Sommeliar India, reported that Nashik Valley Wine was first marketed by Sula in 2000.

Production method
The grape varieties grown in the Nashik valley are: Chenin blanc, Sauvignon blanc, Zinfandel, Cabernet Sauvignon, Shiraz, Chardonnay, Merlot, Riesling, Viognier, Tempranillo, Malbec, and so forth, and also Thompson Seedless grapes.

Plantation
Other methods of planting practices are to adopt "in-situ grafting on dog ridge" or from other root stocks. Planting is done from middle of December to end of January. Harvesting is done from January end to middle of April. Vineyards are protected by trellising. Irrigation is an essential requirement except during the rainy season. Harvesting is done by manual labour. Fertilizers such as Nitrogen, Phosphate, and Potash of appropriate dosages are added as nutrients at specified intervals. Intercultural operations such as rising green manure crops to control soil erosion, conserve moisture by organic mulching and clearing grasses by mowing on the borders at regular intervals are also essentially practised. Pesticides or insecticides are not to be applied; however, fungicides are sprayed and the last such spraying is to be done 45 days before harvesting. Pruning, training the plants to maintain appropriate positions are essential. Harvesting is done during the winter months when the temperature is below . Harvesting is done by manual labour by collecting best bunches of grapes for crushing.

Processing
White wines are generally pressed prior to fermentation using a pneumatic press, whereas red wines are usually crushed using a crusher-destemmer prior to fermentation, and then pressed at the end of the ferment. Enzymes are added to facilitate colour separation and decantation.

Then the must is transferred to stainless steel tanks for the first stage of fermentation and then to oak wood barrels for the malolactic fermentation process. This process takes a minimum of 6 months for red wine. Fermentation is facilitated by adding yeast (usually Saccharomyces cerevisiae and Saccharomyces bayanus in suitable proportion to the fluid being fermented. By this process sugar gets converted to alcohol and the wine is ready for distillation and filtration depending on the status of fomented wine;filtration is done with use of 0.45 micron filter and the wine is filled in bottles. The bottled wine is kept for aging for a minimum of 3 months in the case of red wine and 1–2 months in the case of white wine. It is only after this ageing that the wines are marketed.

Quality
The Nashik valley wine's quality is due to the high altitude at which the grapes are grown and is marked by distinct high acidity with "specific acid-sugar balance." Steven Spurrier, a wine taster, has rated this wine to be between 13 and 17 of ‘Acceptable’ to ‘Very Good’ grade on a 20-point grading system.

See also
Indian wine

References

Further reading
  
Wineries of India
Agriculture in Maharashtra
Economy of Maharashtra
Indian wine
Geographical indications in Maharashtra
Nashik district